Prairie Creek (also called Prairie Valley Creek) is a stream in Crawford County in the U.S. state of Missouri. It is a tributary of Brush Creek.

The stream headwaters arise at  approximately one mile northeast of Cuba and just south of US Route 44. The stream flows under Route 44 and continues to the north-northeast roughly paralleling Missouri Route 19 for about five miles.

Prairie Creek was descriptively named.

See also
List of rivers of Missouri

References

Rivers of Crawford County, Missouri
Rivers of Missouri